Frank Field may refer to:

Frank Field, Baron Field of Birkenhead (born 1942), British politician
Frank Field (Australian politician) (1904–1985), Australian politician
Frank Field (meteorologist), born 1923, American meteorologist
Frank Field (cricketer, born 1874) (1874–1934), English cricketer who played for Warwickshire
Frank Field (Worcestershire cricketer) (1908–1981), English cricketer who played for Worcestershire
Frank H. Field (1922–2013), American scientist
Frank Field (footballer) (1879–1963), Australian rules footballer

See also
Francis Field (disambiguation)
Frank Fielding (born 1988), English footballer
Frank Fields (1914–2005), American musician
Franklin Field (disambiguation)